The following is the final results of the 1987 World Weightlifting Championships. The men's competition was held in Ostrava, Czechoslovakia and the women's competition was held in Daytona Beach, Florida, United States. The women's competition was the first women’s world championship in weightlifting.

Medal summary

Men

Women

Medal table
Ranking by Big (Total result) medals 

Ranking by all medals: Big (Total result) and Small (Snatch and Clean & Jerk)

References

Results (Sport 123)
Weightlifting World Championships Seniors Statistics

External links
Database

W
World Weightlifting Championships
World Weightlifting Championships
International sports competitions hosted by Czechoslovakia
Weightlifting in the Czech Republic